Rites of Passage is the third album by Roger Hodgson, recorded in August 1996 near Hodgson's home in Nevada City, California and his first live album. It was the last gig of several Californian dates in the summer of 1996.

Overview
The album features three Supertramp hits, six songs by Hodgson (five previously unrecorded), two songs written and performed as lead vocalist by Mikail Graham and one song written and performed as lead vocalist by Hodgson's son Andrew.

One of Hodgson's new songs, Showdown, later appeared in a more elaborate version on his studio album Open the Door.

The album was notable for featuring Supertramp member John Helliwell playing on all songs (except Andrew's solo performance), which was a rare exception given that there wasn't much contact between Roger Hodgson and Supertramp members after his split from the band.

The album cover features the 1901 painting The Accolade by Edmund Blair Leighton.

Track listing

Personnel
 musicians
 Roger Hodgson – lead vocals (1–6, 8, 10, 12), guitar (9, 11), piano (2, 3, 5, 10), twelve-string guitar (1, 4, 6, 8, 12)
 Andrew Hodgson – drums (1–6, 9–12), lead vocals (7), piano (7), percussion (8), didgeridoo (8), harmonica (9)
 John Helliwell – saxophone (1, 2, 5, 6, 8, 10–12), percussion (3), backing vocals (2–6, 10)
 Mikail Graham – guitar (1–4, 6, 8–12), lead vocals (9, 11), backing vocals (1–6, 10, 12), keyboards (5, 8), percussion (5, 8), harmonica (5)
 Rich Stanmyre – bass (1–6, 8–12), backing vocals (1–6, 11, 12)
 Jeff Daniel – keyboards (1–6, 8–10, 12), Hammond organ (1–6, 10, 11, 12), percussion (3, 6, 8–11), backing vocals (1–6, 10, 12)
 Terry Riley – tambura (8), backing vocals (8) 
 Josh Neumann – cello (7)
 Ian "Biggles" Lloyd-Bisley – noises (1)

 technicians
 Biff Dawes – live recording engineer
 Harry Andronis – live sound engineer
 Tony Shepherd – lighting direction, video direction
 Joe Gastwirt – mastering
 Ramón Bretón – mastering assistant
 Brian Foraker – mixing engineer
 Karuna Hodgson – production
 Ian "Biggles" Lloyd-Bisley – stage production manager

 art work
 Daniel Clark – art direction, design
 Cole Thompson – photography
 Sunja Park – typography, layout
 Karuna Hodgson – liner notes

Production details 
 mixed at Unicorn Studio
 recorded on the Westwood One mobile recording truck, 2 August 1996, Miners Foundry, Nevada City, California
 live sound by Delicate Productions
 mastered at Oceanview Digital Mastering

References

 

1997 live albums
Roger Hodgson albums